Entremont-le-Vieux (Arpitan: Entremont-le-Viûx) is a commune in the Savoie department in the Auvergne-Rhône-Alpes region in Southeastern France. In 2019, it had a population of 644.

Geography
Entremont-le-Vieux is a landlocked village close to many water streams and winter sports resorts (including Le Désert d'Entremont). It is mainly the Cozon river and its tributaries that flow into the valley that have shaped the landscape.  One of the main features of the town is the dispersion of a set of houses in 26 villages.  The main passes located in the town are the col de la Cluse, the col du Cucheron southwest and the col du Mollard northwest.

Neighboring municipalities
Neighboring communes of Entremont-le-Vieux are Saint-Pierre d'Entremont in Savoie, Sainte-Marie-du-Mont, Saint-Jean-de-Couz and Corbel.

History
The parish of Notre-Dame d'Epernay is the lordship of the Entremonts valley.

The church of Entremont-le-Vieux, Notre-Dame d'Epernay, was rebuilt in the mid-19th century to its present location, sufficiently large to accommodate the 1,800 people of this time.  A fire destroyed the building in 1653. the place was renovated in 1844. Ravaged partly in 1995, the tower and the bells (which dated from 1654) have been completely redone.

In 1934, was built at Entremont-le-Vieux the renowned Fruitière des Entremonts (for milk, cheese and local products).

In 1988, was discovered inside a cave on the slopes of the Massif du Granier, one of the most important archaeological sites of cave bears.  This discovery has led to an extensive research on the existence of these animals in the valley.

Trivia
Entremont-le-Vieux was formerly called Epernay.  This name was retained to designate the village, even today, for many inhabitants of the town.

Population and society

Demographics

Cultural events and festivities
Each year at the end of August, takes place at Entremont-le-Vieux a peasants and artisans party.  We notice at this festivity the presence of many artisans of the Entremonts valley district. The festival usually takes place during a single day, often on a Sunday.

Sports

Winter sports
 In the commune of Entremont-le-Vieux are located two winter sports resorts: Le Désert d'Entremont west and the Granier en Chartreuse northeast.

Cycling
 The Tour de France spent several times by Entremont-le-Vieux by the D912.

Media
 Local TV: France 3 Alpes, TV8 Mont-Blanc 
 Local radio stations: France Bleu Pays de Savoie, Radio Couleur Chartreuse

Personalities
 Robert Montbel 
 Amédée V

Sights
 The Museum of the Cave Bear (Ursus spelaeus)

See also
Communes of the Savoie department

References

Communes of Savoie